Antonio Arbiol y Díez (Torrellas (Zaragoza), 1651 – Zaragoza, January 31 1726) was a Spanish Franciscan and moralistic writer. His works include topics such as the task of comforting the sick or the education of children and offer moral advice.

Works 

 Manuale sacerdotum. 1693. Manual para que sacerdotes aprendan a predicar.
 La Venerable y esclarecida Orden Tercera de San Francisco. 1697. Historia de la orden de San Francisco, de la que evalúa los "principios, leyes, reglas, ejercicios y vidas de sus principales santos."
 Desengaños místicos. 1706. Sobre los errores cometidos durante la oración, esquema de teología, y errores en la espiritualidad.
 El cristiano reformado. 1714. Sobre los ejercicios y devociones de la Tercera Orden.
 La familia regulada con doctrina de la Sagrada Escritura. 1715
 La religiosa instruida. 1717.
 Visita de enfermos y exercicio santo de ayudar a bien morir. 1722.
 Estragos de la lujuria y sus remedios conforme a las Divinas Escrituras. 1726.

References 

17th-century Spanish writers
18th-century Spanish writers
18th-century male writers
1651 births
1726 deaths